Florence Marina State Park is a  Georgia state park located near Omaha on the eastern shore of Walter F. George Lake. The park is known for its deep-water marina and its water recreation sports, such as fishing and waterskiing. The park also attracts bird-watchers with the chance of seeing herons, egrets and, possibly, bald eagles. The park is home to the Kirbo Interpretive Center, which teaches visitors about Native Americans and displays snakes, turtles, fish, and other artifacts from prehistoric times to the early 20th century.

History
The park is on the site of the frontier town of Florence, which was originally named Liverpool, after the English port city. Florence was a prosperous town with a covered bridge linking it to Alabama, a newspaper, bank and hotel. The town went into decline after a flood washed away the bridge in 1846 and the town was bypassed by the railroad. Florence was officially incorporated as a town from 1837 until 1995.

Facilities
39 Tent/Trailer/RV Campsites
7 Cottages
8 Efficiency Units
2 Playgrounds
1 Group Shelter
1 Picnic Shelter
Tennis Courts

Annual events
Christmas on the Lake (December)
Easter Egg Hunt (Easter)

Gallery

See also

References

External links
Florence Marina State Park on the Georgia State Parks website
North Georgia

State parks of Georgia (U.S. state)
Protected areas of Stewart County, Georgia